Tatlı Dillim is a 1972 Turkish romantic comedy film starring Tarık Akan and Filiz Akın, written and directed by Ertem Eğilmez. It is also the first ever film for Kemal Sunal although his role is a very small one.

Cast
 Tarık Akan
 Filiz Akın
 Halit Akçatepe
 Metin Akpınar
 Zeki Alasya
 Hulusi Kentmen
 Münir Özkul
 Kemal Sunal

External links
 

1972 films
Films set in Turkey
1970s Turkish-language films
1972 romantic comedy films
Turkish romantic comedy films
Basketball films
1970s sports comedy films